The Grammy Award for Best Classical Compendium is an honor presented  to recording artists for the best compendium album in the classical music genre at the Grammy Awards, a ceremony that was established in 1958 and which was originally called the Gramophone Awards,. Honors in several categories are presented at the ceremony annually by the National Academy of Recording Arts and Sciences of the United States to "honor artistic achievement, technical proficiency and overall excellence in the recording industry, without regard to album sales or chart position".

This category was created categories for the 55th Grammy Awards. According to the category description guide it is intended "for an album collection containing at least 51 percent playing time of newly recorded material of performances (vocal or instrumental) by various soloist(s) and/or ensemble(s) involving a mixture of classical subgenres" It also states that these albums may not be entered in other classical album categories and classical crossover albums might be eligible.

The Grammy is awarded to the artist(s), album producer(s), engineer(s) and mixer(s) if they are responsible for over 51% of playing time of the album, if other than the artist(s).

Recipients

See also
Grammy Award for Best Classical Vocal Solo
Grammy Award for Best Classical Instrumental Solo
Grammy Award for Best Classical Contemporary Composition

References

External links 
Official site of the Grammy Awards

Grammy Awards for classical music
Awards established in 2012